Melik Mehmed or Muhammad Ghazi, (died 1142) was the fourth ruler of Danishmendids.

Life
Not much is known about his life. 

Melik Mehmet Gazi was mummified. His Kümbet is in Melikgazi, Kayseri. His mummy was vandalized in 1935, where his one hand was cut off. In 1978, the mummy was partially burned.

References

Turkic rulers
Muslims of the First Crusade
1142 deaths
Year of birth unknown
12th-century rulers in Asia
12th-century Turkic people
Danishmend dynasty